T. Kenneth Griffis Jr. is an associate justice of the Supreme Court of Mississippi. He previously served as Presiding Judge on the Mississippi Court of Appeals.

Education and early life

Griffis attended Meridian Community College and Mississippi State University. He received his Bachelor of Accountancy and his Juris Doctor from the University of Mississippi. He was a Certified Public Accountant from 1984 through 2007.

Mississippi Court of Appeals 

Griffis was elected to the Court of Appeals in November 2002 and became a presiding judge in March 2011.

Supreme Court of Mississippi 

On December 19, 2018 Governor Phil Bryant appointed Griffis to the Supreme Court to the seat vacated by William L. Waller Jr. who retired on January 31, 2019. He was sworn in on February 1, 2019.

Teaching 

Griffis has taught as an adjunct professor of law at the University of Mississippi School of Law, Mississippi College School of Law, Belhaven University and Meridian Community College.

Personal life 
He is originally from Meridian, Mississippi. He currently resides in Ridgeland, Mississippi with his wife and five sons.

References 

Living people
Date of birth missing (living people)
Year of birth missing (living people)
21st-century American judges
Mississippi Court of Appeals judges
Justices of the Mississippi Supreme Court
People from Meridian, Mississippi
University of Mississippi alumni
University of Mississippi School of Law alumni
University of Mississippi faculty